Hugo and Josephine is a Swedish film which was released to cinemas in Sweden on 16 December 1967, written and directed by Kjell Grede. The film is loosely based on three novels by Maria Gripe, and it stars Fredrik Becklén and Marie Öhman in the lead roles, with Beppe Wolgers, Helena Brodin and Inga Landgré in supporting roles. The film won the Guldbagge Award for Best Film at the 5th Guldbagge Awards.

Production
The film was mostly shot in Kårsta between June–September 1967.

Plot
The film is about a girl named Josephine (Marie Öhman), who is the daughter of a priest and lives in the country. She has no friends, but one day she meets Hugo (Fredrik Becklén), who is the nephew of the gardener Gudmarson. Along with him and Gudmarson (Beppe Wolgers), she experiences a fantastic summer.

Cast
 Fredrik Becklén as Hugo Andersson
 Marie Öhman as Josephine (Jenny Grå)
 Beppe Wolgers as Gudmarsson, gardener and Hugo's uncle
 Inga Landgré as Josephine's mother
 Helena Brodin as Miss Ingrid Sund, the teacher
 Bellan Roos as Lyra, the lonely old woman on a bicycle
 Karl Carlsson as Karl Carlsson
 Tord Stål as Josephine's father (voice)

References

External links
 
 

1967 films
1967 drama films
Swedish children's films
Swedish drama films
1960s Swedish-language films
Films directed by Kjell Grede
Films based on Swedish novels
Best Film Guldbagge Award winners
Films whose director won the Best Director Guldbagge Award
Films shot in Sweden
1960s Swedish films